Everybody's Talkin' is the second album and the first live album by the 11-piece Tedeschi Trucks Band and was released in 2012 by Sony Masterworks. It's been released as a 2-CD and 3-CD set as well as a three disc vinyl set. The title comes from the song carrying the same name, formerly a hit for Harry Nilsson. The band's cover is a hybrid of the Nilsson and Bill Withers versions.

The songs on the album are a compilation of recordings from the following three nights
 October 25, 2011 at The Danforth Music Hall, Toronto, ON by Embrace Presents
 October 28, 2011 at the Warner Theatre, Washington, D.C.
 October 29, 2011 at Fairfield Theatre Compagny at The Klein, Bridgeport, CT

In an interview with Rolling Stone magazine, Trucks stated many of the tracks came from the almost-cancelled Bridgeport, CT show. "There was a real loose feeling to it, which ended up being great. We used a lot of stuff from that night."

Reception

Writing for Allmusic, critic Thom Jurek wrote "It's an unusual live record because its balance of sonic precision and stage-born kinetics is perfect—this band transitions seamlessly between R&B, blues, rock, gospel, and jazz. These performances never succumb to mere jam band clichés... Everybody's Talkin' is what every live album should be: an accurate, exciting reflection of a hot band playing full-throttle." He especially praised Tedeschi as "among the truly great singers in modern blues and rock; by turns graceful and grainy, her expression reaches the spiritual in execution." Will Layman of PopMatters praised the performances and called it "the kind of music that shamelessly moves at you with emotion and soul". Doug Collette of All About Jazz generally praised the album, especially the sound, but was critical of the length of the songs, commenting on the "shortage of instrumental fireworks".

The review aggregator site, Metacritic calculated an average score of 75 based on 6 reviews.

Track listing

Disc 1

Disc 2

Personnel
 Derek Trucks – lead guitar
 Susan Tedeschi – lead vocals, rhythm guitar
 Oteil Burbridge – bass guitar
 Kofi Burbridge  – keyboards, flute
 Tyler Greenwell – drums, percussion
 J. J. Johnson – drums, percussion
 Mike Mattison – harmony vocals
 Mark Rivers – harmony vocals
 Kebbi Williams – saxophone
 Maurice "Mobetta" Brown – trumpet
 Saunders Sermons – trombone

Credits
 Producers - Derek Trucks
 Engineers - Bobby Tis
 Additional Engineer - Marty Wall
 Mixing - Jim Scott 
 Mastering - Bob Ludwig

Chart positions

References 

2012 live albums
Tedeschi Trucks Band live albums